Hanns is a given name. Notable people with the name include:

Hanns Blaschke (1896–1971), Austrian politician
Hanns Bolz (1885–1918), German expressionist and cubist painter
Hanns Brandstätter (born 1949), Austrian fencer
Hanns Braun (1886–1918), German athlete
Hanns Cibulka (1920–2004), German Bohemian poet and diarist
Hanns Eckelkamp (1927–2021), German film producer and founder of Atlas Filmverleih
Hanns Eisler (1898–1962), Austrian composer
Hanns Heinz Ewers (1871–1943), German actor, poet, philosopher, and writer of short stories and novels
Hanns Wolf (1894–1968), German composer and conductor
Hanns Joachim Friedrichs (1927–1995), German journalist
Hanns In der Gand, pen name of Ladislaus Krupski (1882–1947), Swiss folklorist and collector of traditional and military songs
Hanns Bruno Geinitz (1814–1900), German geologist, born at Altenburg, the capital of Saxe-Altenburg
Hanns Georgi (1901–1989), German painter, printmaker and book illustrator
Hanns Goebl (1901–1986), Bavarian sculptor who worked for the Nymphenburg Porcelain Factory
Hanns Grössel (1932–2012), German literary translator and broadcasting journalist
Hanns Günther, pseudonym of Walter de Haas (1886–1969), a prolific German author, translator, and editor of popular science books
Hanns Heise (1913–1992), Oberstleutnant in the Luftwaffe during World War II
Hanns Hopp (1890–1971), German architect
Hanns Hörbiger (1860–1931), Austrian engineer from Vienna with roots in Tyrol
Hanns Dieter Hüsch (1925–2005), German author, cabaret artist, actor, songwriter and radio commentator
Hanns Jana (born 1952), German fencer
Hanns Jelinek (1901–1969), Austrian composer of Czech descent who is also known under the pseudonym Hanns Elin
Hanns Johst (1890–1978), German playwright and Nazi Poet Laureate
Hanns Kerrl (1887–1941), German Nazi politician
Hanns Kilian (1905–1981), German bobsledder who competed from the late 1920s to the late 1930s
Hanns Kräly (1884–1950), credited in the United States as Hans Kraly, was a German actor and screenwriter
Hanns Kreisel (1931–2017), German mycologist and professor emeritus
Hanns Laengenfelder (1903–1982), Generalmajor in the Wehrmacht during World War II
Hanns Lilje (1899–1977), German Lutheran bishop and one of the pioneers of the ecumenical movement
Hanns Lippmann (1890–1929), German film producer of the silent era
Hanns Lothar (1929–1967), German film actor
 Hanns Ludin (1905–1947), German Nazi diplomat executed for war crimes
Hanns Maaßen (1908–1983), German journalist and writer
Hanns Malissa (1920–2010), Austrian analytical chemist and environmental chemist
Hanns von Meyenburg (1887–1971), Swiss pathologist
Hanns Nägle (1902–?), German bobsledder who competed in the late 1920s
Hanns Albin Rauter (1895–1949), high-ranking Austrian-born Nazi war criminal
Hanns Sachs (1881–1947), one of the earliest psychoanalysts, and a close personal friend of Sigmund Freud
Hanns Scharff (1907–1992), German Luftwaffe interrogator during the Second World War
Hanns Martin Schleyer (1915–1977), German business executive and employer and industry representative
Hanns Schwarz (1888–1945), Austrian film director
Hanns Seidel (1901–1961), German politician and Bavarian prime minister from 1957 to 1960
Hanns Egon Wörlen (1915–2014), German architect and art patron
Hanns Zischler (born 1947), German actor most famous in America for his portrayal of Hans in Steven Spielberg's film Munich

See also
Hanns-Peter Boehm (born 1928), German chemist
Hanns-Christian Kaiser (born 1969), German artist
Hanns-Heinrich Lohmann (1911–1995), World War II Waffen SS officer
Hanns-Horst von Necker (1903–1979), Generalmajor in the Luftwaffe during World War II
Hanns-Josef Ortheil (born 1951), German author, scholar of German literature and pianist
Hanns-Joachim-Friedrichs-Award, German award for journalism
Hann (disambiguation)
Hannes
Hannus
Hans (disambiguation)
Iohannis
Johannes
Johannis (disambiguation)
Ohannes